Bùi Hoàng Việt Anh (born 1 January 1999) is a Vietnamese professional footballer who plays as a centre-back for V.League 1 club Hà Nội and the Vietnam national team.

International career

International goals

Vietnam U23

Honours 
Hồng Lĩnh Hà Tĩnh
V.League 2: 2019
Hà Nội
V.League 1: 2022
Vietnamese National Cup: 2020, 2022
Vietnamese Super Cup: 2020, 2021
Vietnam U23
Southeast Asian Games: 2021
Vietnam
AFF Championship runner-up: 2022
VFF Cup: 2022
Individual Titles
Youth Vietnamese Player of the Year: 2020

References

External links
 

1999 births
Living people
Vietnamese footballers
Hanoi FC players
V.League 1 players
Vietnam international footballers
People from Thái Bình province
Association football central defenders
Competitors at the 2021 Southeast Asian Games
Southeast Asian Games competitors for Vietnam